Pictionary, taglined The Game of Video Quick Draw, is a video board game developed by Software Creations and published by LJN for the Nintendo Entertainment System. It is based on the board game of the same name. Players may play in up to four teams of unlimited players.

Modes of play
There are two modes of play: "Regular Game" and "Alternative Game".

Regular game mode
In "Regular Game" mode, you can either play in teams, or against the CPU. If you play against the CPU, or if you play with only two people, then the game is played by completing a series of minigames, every point scored revealing a part of a picture, and after the minigame is over, you must guess what the picture is, based on the amount you've been able to reveal.

If you're successful in guessing what the picture is, then you can "roll" a virtual die, to decide how many spaces you may move along the "board". The first person to reach the end of the board wins the game and is declared the Queen of England and the ruler of Middle Earth.

If you play in teams of two or more, then a "designated drawer" is chosen, and instead of the computer drawing a picture, you yourself draw a picture of something the computer has pre-decided upon (for example, 'snowmobile') using the controller, and if it is correctly guessed, the user must use the honor system to tell the game whether or not the answer was guessed correctly.

If your team guesses correctly, you may roll the virtual die, and proceed that number of spaces down the board. Whoever reaches the finish space first wins the game.

Alternative game mode
Alternative Game Mode is played much the same way as "Regular Game Mode", except instead of the Computer supplying an answer, the designated drawer does so himself, and both teams may guess instead of just the drawer's team. At the end of a round, the game asks which team was successful in guessing, and you may choose "Nobody did", Team 1, Team 2, Team 3, or Team 4. If no one wins, then play moves on to the other team's designated drawer, and a new round begins. If a team guesses correctly, they may roll the virtual die, and proceed down the board. The first team to reach the end of the board is declared the winner.

Text parsing
The game's text parser screens for profane words and phrases.  If a player tries to enter a team name with obscene words, the game will not allow the name to be used, and the player must choose a new one.  If one tries to input forbidden words while solving a puzzle, the text input will automatically be blanked when the last letter of the word is entered, and the player must guess again.  Forbidden words include George Carlin's "seven dirty words," anatomical references such as "penis", among other words.  Some inconsistencies exist; e.g. "asshole" is not blocked out, but "ass hole" (as an open compound word) is blocked, and so is "anus."

Notes

References

1990 video games
LJN games
Nintendo Entertainment System games
North America-exclusive video games
Nintendo Entertainment System-only games
Puzzle video games
Multiplayer and single-player video games
Video games based on board games
Video games scored by Tim Follin
Video games developed in the United Kingdom